Pōhā are traditional Māori bags made from southern bull kelp, which are used to carry and store food and fresh water, to propagate live shellfish, and to make clothing and equipment for sports. Pōhā are especially associated with Ngāi Tahu, who have legally recognised rights for harvesting source species of kelp.

Construction
Blades from southern bull kelp (rimurapa in Māori) species such as Durvillaea antarctica and D. poha (named after the pōhā) were used to construct the bags. The kelp blades have a 'honeycomb' structure, which allows them to be split open, hollowed out (pōhā hau) and inflated into containers. Inflated blades are hung out to dry and then deflated and rolled up for transport. Tōtara bark can be used to cover and protect the bags.

Uses

Transport
Pōhā are used to transport food, fresh water, to enclose food within an oven, and to transport and propagate live seafood such as shellfish (including toheroa), sea stars and pāua in a process referred to as whakawhiti kaimoana. Pōhā were often used to carry and store muttonbird (tītī) chicks. Pōhā form an airtight seal and food can be safely stored inside them for up to two or three years.

Clothing and sport

Members of Ngāi Tahu used inflated pōhā to protect their bodies (like a wetsuit) while foraging for seafood, and stories by iwi indicate that pōhā were used for surfing in a sport called kauai or kaukau.

References

External links
A Seaweed Pantry - Tales from Te Papa episode 100, Museum of New Zealand Te Papa Tongarewa (YouTube video)
Te Ara: The Encyclopedia of New Zealand, Story: Te Māori i te ohanga – Māori in the economy: Pōhā containers
Māoritube Pōhā (Bull Kelp Bags) – Ngāi Tahu Mahinga Kai
Pōhā - Ngāi Tahu Mahinga Kai (direct link to video on YouTube)

Polynesian culture
Māori culture